Vitta cristata is a species of small freshwater snail with an operculum, an aquatic gastropod mollusk in the family Neritidae, the nerites.

Distribution
This species of nerite is found in Africa: in Cameroon, Ivory Coast, Gabon, and Sierra Leone.

References

 Morelet, A. (1864). Description de coquilles inédites. Journal de conchyliologie. 12 (3): 155–159; 286–290. page(s): 288 
 Breure, A. S. H., Audibert, C., Ablett, J. D. (2018). Pierre Marie Arthur Morelet (1809-1892) and his contributions to malacology. Leiden: Nederlandse Malacologische Vereniging. 544 pp.
 Eichhorst T.E. (2016). Neritidae of the world. Volume 2. Harxheim: Conchbooks. Pp. 696-1366  

Neritidae
Gastropods described in 1864
Gastropods of Africa
Invertebrates of Cameroon
Invertebrates of Gabon
Invertebrates of West Africa
Freshwater snails
Taxonomy articles created by Polbot